Kala Koreysh (Dargwa: Кьара-Кьурейш) is an abandoned village in the Dakhadaevsky district of Dagestan. It served as the medieval capital of the Kaitag Utsmiate and was a large feudal estate. The main attraction of the village are the mosque (founded in the 11th century).

Population 
According to the Soviet Census of 1926, the Kaitag people made up 100% of the national population structure.

References

Sources 

 

Dagestan
Former villages in Russia